Diamantopoulos or Diamandopoulos is a Greek surname. The feminine form is Diamantopoulou (Διαμαντοπούλου). It may refer to:

  (born 1958), Greek-British business scholar
Anna Diamantopoulou (born 1959), Greek politician
 Athanasios Diamandopoulos (born 1943), Greek physician
Chris Diamantopoulos (born 1975), Canadian actor
 , fighter of the Greek War of Independence
 , Greek football player
 , Greek basketball player and coach
  (1914-1995), Greek painter
Dimitris Diamantopoulos (born 1988), Greek association football player
  (born 1980), Greek MP elected in June 2012
 , fighter of the Greek War of Independence
Giorgos Diamantopoulos (born 1980), Greek basketball player
  (1905-1993), Greek physician and politician
 Stavros Diamantopoulos (born 1947), Greek football manager
Takis Diamantopoulos (born 1939), Greek photographer
 , Greek political scholar
Vasilis Diamantopoulos (1920-1999), Greek actor

Greek-language surnames
Surnames